Tagmadert (also Tagumadert, Tagmad(d)art, Tigumedet) is a city in the Draa River valley in Morocco. It is the place of origin of the members of the Saadi Dynasty. Despite the fact that Tagmadert is indicated on most older European maps, there is some uncertainty about its exact location. According to Charles de Foucauld its location was identical to present-day Fezouata, the district directly north of the Ktawa, including the village of Tamegroute. There is a description of Tagmadert by the 17th century traveller Marmol. The name seems to have referred to both a district and a town.

The town Tagmadert was founded in 1550 by Mohammed ash-Sheikh. It was probably destroyed during the reign of Moulay Slimane (1792–1822), possibly like Sijilmassa in 1818 by Aït Atta Berber tribes. The present village of Amezrou may have been built on its ruins. A sequia (irrigation canal) called Tagmadert still exists today in that place. Unfortunately there are no archeological records or Arabic or Berber language sources from which to deduce unequivocal conclusions about its location.

The Saadi were Shurafa of Tagmadert. The first Sultan of that dynasty Mohammed ash-Sheikh was called "al Drawi at-Tagmadert". Some of the members of the Saadi Dynasty have proudly inscribed  Tagmadert as their place of birth on their tombstone.

References

See also
Draa River valley
Saadi dynasty
Abu Abdallah al-Qaim
Mohammed ash-Sheikh

Former populated places in Morocco